Prince Regent National Park, formerly the Prince Regent Nature Reserve, is a protected area in the Kimberley region of Western Australia.  In 1978 the area was nominated as a UNESCO World Biosphere Reserve.

Land
The landscape of the reserve ranges from lush rainforest to sandstone plains. The area contains gorges, waterfalls, cliffs and mountain ranges.

Careening Bay, on Coronation Island, site of "The Mermaid Tree" (after , Philip Parker King's ship) is within the park. The boab tree was inscribed by the ship's carpenter when the vessel was deliberately careened (beached) in order to undertake repairs.

Traditional owners
The traditional owners of the area round the river are the Worrorra peoples, but the park lies mainly in Wunambal land.

As part of the same native title claim lodged in 1998 by Wanjina Wunggurr RNTBC known as the Dambimangari claim, which included claims for the three peoples in the Wanjina Wunggurr cultural bloc, referred to as Dambimangari (Worrorra), Uunguu (Wunambal) and Wilinggin (Ngarinyin), the Uunguu parts of the claims were determined on 23 May 2011. Inland, it includes parts of the Mitchell River National Park and the Prince Regent National Park.

Wildlife
More than half of the bird and mammal species found in the Kimberley region are found within the national park. It is home to the monjon, the smallest of the rock-wallabies, and the golden bandicoot - listed as a vulnerable species.  The Prince Regent and Mitchell River Important Bird Area which overlaps part of the national park, is an area identified as an Important Bird Area by BirdLife International, an international non-government organisation, because of its importance for a range of bird species, especially those restricted to tropical savanna habitats.

Access
The area remains one of Australia's most remote wilderness areas with no roads and formidable tide-races and whirlpools restricting seaward access. The area is mostly accessed by air or by boat and has remained virtually unchanged since European settlement of Western Australia.  A permit is required to enter the national park and can be obtained from the Parks and Wildlife Service.

See also
List of biosphere reserves in Australia

References

External links

National parks of Western Australia
Kimberley (Western Australia)
Biosphere reserves of Australia
Kimberley tropical savanna